Anamulenge Constituency is an electoral constituency in the Omusati Region of northern Namibia. It had 12,470 inhabitants in 2004 and 11,186 registered voters . Its district capital is the settlement of Anamulenge.

Settlements
 Onhokolo

Politics
Anamulenge is traditionally a stronghold of the South West Africa People's Organization (SWAPO) party. In the 2015 local and regional elections SWAPO candidate Werner Kalipi won uncontested and became councillor after no opposition party nominated a candidate. The SWAPO candidate won the 2020 regional election by a landslide. Tylves Angala obtained 3,664 votes, followed by independent candidate Erphas Heita with 361 votes and Joseph Shiningayamwe of the Independent Patriots for Change (IPC), an opposition party formed in August 2020, with 241 votes.

References

Constituencies of Omusati Region
States and territories established in 1992
1992 establishments in Namibia